Anytime...Anywhere is the sixth album by Rita Coolidge released in 1977 on the A&M Records label. The album is her most successful, reaching #6 on the Billboard 200 and having been certified platinum (over 1 million U.S. copies sold). The album spawned three Billboard top twenty hits; a cover of 
Boz Scaggs' "We're All Alone" (#7), a cover of The Temptations' "The Way You Do The Things You Do" (#20), and the album's biggest hit, "(Your Love Has Lifted Me) Higher and Higher" (#2), a remake of Jackie Wilson's "(Your Love Keeps Lifting Me) Higher and Higher".

Track listing

Side one
 "(Your Love Has Lifted Me) Higher and Higher" (Paul Smith, Gary Jackson, Raynard Miner, Billy Davis) – 3:59
 "The Way You Do the Things You Do" (William "Smokey" Robinson, Robert Rogers) – 3:35
 "We're All Alone" (Boz Scaggs) – 3:38
 "I Feel the Burden (Being Lifted Off My Shoulders)" (Glen Clark) – 2:46
 "I Don't Want to Talk About It" (Danny Whitten) – 3:36

Side two
 "Words" (Barry Gibb, Robin Gibb, Maurice Gibb) – 3:25
 "Good Times" (Sam Cooke) – 2:42
 "Who's to Bless and Who's to Blame" (Kris Kristofferson) – 3:37
 "Southern Lady" (Michael Hazlewood) – 3:30
 "The Hungry Years" (Neil Sedaka, Howard Greenfield) – 4:18

Production
Recording Engineers:  Marty Lewis, Kend Nebergall & Warren Dewey
Mixing Engineer:  Kent Bevergall
Recorded at Sunset Sound Studios, A&M Record Studios and Studio 55
Mixed at Sunset Sound Studios
Masterer at the Mastering Lab by Mike Reese
Art Direction:  Roland Young
Album design:  Chuck Beason
Photographs by Dick Zimmerman
Production Assistant: Ellen Vogt

Source: Anytime...Anywhere album cover

Personnel 
Rita Coolidge – lead vocals
Jerry McGee – guitar
Dean Parks - guitar
Leland Sklar – bass
Booker T. Jones – piano, electric piano, synthesizer, organ, backing vocals, arranger
Mike Utley – piano, electric piano, synthesizer, organ
Gayle Levant – harp
Clydie King – vocals
Sherlie Matthews – vocals
Kim Carnes – backing vocals
Venetta Fields – backing vocals
Daniel Timms – backing vocals
Mike Baird – drums
Sammy Creason – drums
Bobbye Hall – percussion

Charts

Certifications and sales

References 

Rita Coolidge albums
1977 albums
Albums produced by David Anderle
A&M Records albums
Albums recorded at Sunset Sound Recorders
Albums recorded at A&M Studios